Saint-Erme-Outre-et-Ramecourt is a commune in the Aisne department in Hauts-de-France in northern France. Saint-Erme station has rail connections to Reims and Laon.

Population

See also
Communes of the Aisne department

References

Communes of Aisne
Remi
Aisne communes articles needing translation from French Wikipedia